The 1960 United States Senate election in Wyoming was held on November 8, 1960. Incumbent Democratic Senator Joseph C. O'Mahoney was first appointed to the U.S. Senate from Wyoming's Class 1 Senate seat in 1934, and was re-elected in 1934, 1940, and 1946 before losing re-election in 1952. He was then elected to the Class 2 Senate seat in 1954. O'Mahoney, in failing health and increasingly limited in his mobility, declined to run for a fifth non-consecutive term in the Senate. The winner of this election, Keith Thomson, died before assuming his elected office.

Accordingly, a competitive race for the open seat ensued. Congressman Keith Thomson won the Republican primary over former U.S. Senator and former Governor Frank A. Barrett, while 1958 Democratic congressional nominee Raymond B. Whitaker, the former Natrona County Prosecuting Attorney, beat out State Superintendent Velma Linford to win the Democratic nomination, queueing up a rematch between Thomson and Whitaker. Despite Democrats' recent history of winning competitive Senate elections in Wyoming, however, Thomson defeated Whitaker by a wide margin, closely matching Richard M. Nixon's margin over John F. Kennedy in the presidential election. However, Thomson died of a heart attack on December 9th, prior to his assuming office. Democratic Governor John J. Hickey appointed himself to fill the vacancy; Hickey would serve until his defeat in the 1962 special election. 

A Republican gain turned into a Democratic retention of the seat following Thomson's death and Hickey's decision to have himself appointed.

Democratic primary

Candidates
 Raymond B. Whitaker, former Natrona County Prosecuting Attorney, 1958 Democratic nominee for the U.S. House of Representatives 
 Velma Linford, Wyoming Superintendent of Public Instruction
 Carl A. Johnson, perennial candidate 
 Charles B. Chittim, former State Senator

Results

Republican Primary

Candidates
 Keith Thomson, U.S. Congressman from Wyoming's at-large congressional district
 Frank A. Barrett, former U.S. Senator, former Governor of Wyoming
 Miff M. Butler, mining engineer

Results

General election

Results

Senator-elect Thomson died on December 9th 1960, and with the appointment of Governor John Hickey at the beginning of what should've been Thomson's term, the Democrats retained this seat until a special election was held in 1962.

References

Wyoming
1960
1960 Wyoming elections